The Canadian Women's Suffrage Association, originally called the Toronto Women's Literary Guild, was an organization based in Toronto, Ontario, Canada, that fought for women's rights.

The Toronto Women's Literary Guild was established in 1877 to fight for women's rights and for improved working conditions. Jessie Turnbull and Dr. Emily Howard Stowe, Canada's second licensed female physician, were founders. The guild had some success in improving access to higher education for women.
It was renamed the Canadian Women's Suffrage Association in 1883 with Jessie (McEwen) Turnbull as its first president.

The Toronto-based association worked towards opening up education to women, and allowing women to advance as professionals, particularly as doctors.

After the association had been inactive for a while, the leaders founded the Dominion Women's Enfranchisement Association in 1889.

See also
List of suffragists and suffragettes
List of women's rights activists
Timeline of women's suffrage
Women's suffrage organizations
Feminism in Canada

References
Citations

Sources

Feminism in Ontario
Organizations based in Toronto
Women's organizations based in Canada
Organizations established in 1877
Suffrage organizations in Canada
Women's suffrage in Canada
Women in Toronto
Feminist organizations in Canada
1877 establishments in Canada